A Skin So Soft is a 2017 documentary film, directed by Canadian director Denis Côté. A Canadian, French and Swiss coproduction, the film chronicles the daily monotonous routines of a select few men whose lives revolve around extreme bodybuilding.

The film premiered at the Locarno International Film Festival in August 2017, and is slated to have its Canadian premiere at the 2017 Toronto International Film Festival.

The movie was originally produced in French and some have noted that the title's translation to English has produced a linguistic chasm. The direct translation of the French title, Ta peau si lisse being "a skin so smooth", which upon initial examination flows more easily with the images that come to mind when one thinks of the over pumped and well-maintained muscles of the Canadian bodybuilders featured, than the delicate title A Skin So Soft.

Summary
Jean-François, Ronald, Alexis, Cédric, Benoit and Maxim are tenacious strongman of modern times. Coming from backgrounds as diverse as Strongman (strength athlete) to a longtime bodybuilder to a veteran, they all share one common and ultimate desire; to overcome the limitations of man. The movies capture the intimacy, precision and discipline required of these strongmen in their daily lives.

Cast

Critical reception 
Many critics praised director Côté's unique focus on portraying the humane and sensitive sentiments of the bodybuilders. While the movie does highlight the tenacity and grit required to maintain this lifestyle, the unexpected focus on the alternative beauty available in this lifestyle was well received. However, amongst the unique beauty being portrayed, there was a general sentiment that the film lost itself with poorly guided humour. That worked in opposition to the magnificent beauty of man and muscle as it induced the audience to poke fun at the silliness of the vanity and intense obsession.

Amongst the unique focus of the film, the Montreal Gazette applauded the breakaway from a traditional narrative. In their review they admitted that while this was labelled a documentary, Côté was able to unsurprisingly captivate his audience by scraping a crafted tumultuous script and focus on the mundanity of their lives. A focus that they regarded as successful due to Côté's uncanny ability to make watching paint dry exciting.

In the official write-up for the film on the New Horizons Film Festival's website, Piotr Mirski states that the director is "fascinated with the bodybuilders" and furtherly notices: "The protagonists lift incredibly heavy weights so they can proudly flex their muscles in front of a mirror, a camera or a crowd of people. These are rough, strong men who simply want to feel beautiful." A reviewer from the LGBT-focused website We'll Always Have the Movies believed that the movie lacked depth and Côté's minimalist approach was one of its weak points. He noted: "It could have been a fine documentary about male rivalry and physical strength-obsessed individuals but Côté never went that way—despite the fact that they had all the tools needed." Slant Magazine's Clayton Dillard opined that Côté "consistently seeks to challenge the stereotypical displays of masculinity and meat-headed belligerence that weightlifters are prone to".

François Messier-Rheault won the Prix Iris for Best Cinematography in a Documentary at the 20th Quebec Cinema Awards in 2018.

References

External links
 

2017 films
2017 documentary films
Canadian sports documentary films
French documentary films
Swiss documentary films
2010s French-language films
Films directed by Denis Côté
Documentary films about bodybuilding
French-language Swiss films
French-language Canadian films
2010s Canadian films
2010s French films